Screaming Life is the debut EP by the American rock band Soundgarden, released in October 1987 through Sub Pop Records. Screaming Life was later combined with the band's next EP, Fopp (1988), and released as the Screaming Life/Fopp compilation album in 1990.

Recording
The EP was recorded in 1987 in Seattle, Washington, at Reciprocal Studios with producer Jack Endino, who also produced albums for Nirvana and Mudhoney.

Music and lyrics
Drummer Matt Cameron described the sound on the EP as "pretty raw". "Hunted Down", Soundgarden's first single, is representative of the early "grunge" sound—with its dirty guitar, dissonant atmosphere and lyrics concerning entrapment and escape. "Nothing to Say" features drop D tuning, which would become a signature of Soundgarden's sound on later albums. Guitarist Kim Thayil said he learned about the tuning from Buzz Osborne of the Melvins, when Osborne was telling him about Black Sabbath.

Earlier versions of "Tears to Forget" appeared on the band's 1985 demo tape and on the 1986 Deep Six compilation album, which featured some of the first recordings by the earliest Seattle grunge bands, including Soundgarden. That version was recorded with drummer Scott Sundquist, but the version on Screaming Life was recorded with Cameron.

Some time prior to recording, Endino found old rolls of quarter-inch tape at a garage sale, and some contained recordings of a Christian preacher giving sermons in the early 1950s. Soundgarden frontman Chris Cornell had the idea to have the preacher's voice on "Hand of God". The recording was synched with the eight-track machine, copied to an empty track and by coincidence (or because, as Endino says, "God smiled upon us") the tape rolls matched perfectly with the song. Cornell also added his own sarcastic preacher-style vocals, with the lines "Let it be known today, if you've got two hands/You're supposed to pray." According to Endino, the labels on the rolls of tape were near-illegible and thus the name of the preacher remains unknown.

Release and reception
Cornell said that the EP was met with rave reviews and that "everybody loved it." "Hunted Down" was Soundgarden's first single and also the first song on Sub Pop's "hold music" tape. According to Thayil, "you would call them up, and when they put you on hold you heard 'Hunted Down'." It was the only single released from the EP. "Nothing to Say" was Soundgarden's first B-side, released on the "Hunted Down" single. The song also appeared on the KCMU compilation tape, Bands That Will Make Money, which was distributed to record companies. Upon hearing the song, record labels began contacting the band, which eventually led to the band signing with A&M Records.

Packaging
The EP's cover art, photographed by Charles Peterson, features a sepia-toned black-and-white photograph of Cornell singing and Thayil playing guitar in the background. The album cover was an attempt by Sub Pop to capitalize on Cornell's image. The first 500 copies of the EP were pressed on transparent orange vinyl; after that, they were released on standard black vinyl. A second pressing was later made, pressed by Erika Records, but still on the Sub Pop label, in black, sea green marble, blue marble, red, pink marble and purple marble vinyl.

The title of the EP inspired the title of a book of photography by Peterson, named Screaming Life: A Chronicle of the Seattle Music Scene. Published in 1995, it is composed mainly of live photos taken by Peterson from the mid-1980s through the mid-1990s. Many of Peterson's photographs were used as album artwork for grunge bands. The book is accompanied by a CD, with nine songs selected by Peterson from bands of the era – Soundgarden's "Entering" is one of these songs.

Track listing

Outtakes
The song "Toy Box" was recorded during the sessions for Screaming Life. It was later featured on the "Flower" single.  The instrumental track "The Telephantasm" was recorded mostly during these sessions and was released as a separate single in late 2010 and as an iTunes bonus track on Telephantasm.

Personnel
Soundgarden
Matt Cameron –  drums
Chris Cornell –  vocals
Kim Thayil –  guitar
Hiro Yamamoto –  bass

Production
Jack Endino –  production, engineering
Charles Peterson –  snapshots
Soundgarden –  production

Management
Susan Silver Management – management

References

1987 debut EPs
Soundgarden EPs
Sub Pop EPs
Albums produced by Chris Cornell
Albums produced by Matt Cameron
Albums produced by Jack Endino